Brush Creek is a stream in Harrison County in the U.S. state of Missouri. It is a tributary of the Thompson River.

Brush Creek most likely was named for the brush lining its course.

See also
List of rivers of Missouri

References

Rivers of Harrison County, Missouri
Rivers of Missouri